The Unionist Democratic Union is a political party in Tunisia with pan-Arabist ideology.

History and profile
The party was founded on 30 November 1988 when it was recognized by the authorities. Its founder and first secretary-general Abderrahmane Tlili had been a member of the RCD before he founded the UDU in order to gather Arab nationalists, including Baathists and Nasserists, in a party that was close to the government. The party publishes a newspaper, Al Watan.

In 1994, the electoral law was changed, ensuring the parliamentary representation of minor parties. The MDS received 3 of 163 seats (19 being reserved for the opposition). In the 1999 election, the party won seven seats, which it won again in the 2004 election. In 2009, this increased to nine seats.

In the election for the Constituent Assembly after the Tunisian revolution of 2011, the UDU failed to win any seats.

Footnotes

1988 establishments in Tunisia
Arab nationalism in Tunisia
Arab socialist political parties
Pan-Arabist political parties
Political parties established in 1988
Socialist parties in Tunisia